is a passenger railway station located in the city of Akashi, Hyōgo Prefecture, Japan, operated by the private Sanyo Electric Railway.

Lines

Station layout
The station consists of two unnumbered ground-level opposed side platforms connected by a footbridge. The station is unattended.

Platforms

Adjacent stations

|-
!colspan=5|Sanyo Electric Railway

History
Ōkuradani Station opened on April 12, 1917.

Passenger statistics
In fiscal 2018, the station was used by an average of 1277 passengers daily (boarding passengers only).

Surrounding area
 Okura Hachiman Shrine
 Okura Beach

See also
List of railway stations in Japan

References

External links

 Official website (Sanyo Electric Railway) 

Railway stations in Japan opened in 1917
Railway stations in Hyōgo Prefecture
Akashi, Hyōgo